Ships in the British Royal Navy:

 , a third rate ship of the line launched in 1815, broken up in 1841
 , launched in 1892 as the pre-dreadnought battleship HMS Revenge, renamed in 1915, scrapped in 1919

Ships in the French Navy:

See also
 Redoubtable (film), a 2017 film

Redoubtable